Cheesehead is a nickname in the United States for a person from Wisconsin or for a fan of the Green Bay Packers NFL football franchise.

Current usage
Wisconsin is associated with cheese because the state historically produced more dairy products than other American states, giving it the nickname "America's Dairyland." The use of the term "cheesehead" as a derogatory word for Wisconsinites originated with Illinois football and baseball fans to refer to opposing Wisconsin sports fans. The term, however, was quickly embraced by Wisconsinites and is now a point of pride.

Cheesehead hat
Rose Bruno first saw a cardboard "cheesehead" hat at a Milwaukee Brewers vs. Chicago White Sox game in Chicago in 1987 worn by fellow Milwaukeean Amerik Wojciechowski. Ralph Bruno later made the first one out of foam while he was cutting up his mother's couch. It was made popular by center-fielder Rick Manning, who saw the hat while playing. Bruno started a multi-million dollar business (1 Million dollars in annual sales) to sell the hats as novelties. The "Cheesehead" trademark is owned by Foamation, Inc. of St. Francis, Wisconsin, which began manufacture of the wearable, foam "Cheesehead" in 1987. Along with the original Cheesehead "wedge", Foamation has made other similar "cheese" apparel, including baseball caps, cowboy hats, and earrings. The Cheesehead gained attention in 1995, when Packers fan Frank Emmert Jr. was flying on a private plane back to Wisconsin after attending a Packers game against the Cleveland Browns and the plane crashed due to ice accumulation. Emmert suffered a broken ankle and other minor injuries, but was saved from further serious injury when he used his Cheesehead for protection in the crash. 

In 2013, sports fans of Chicago replied to their rivals by wearing cheese graters.

Other origins
kaaskop, Dutch for "Cheesehead", is used as a slanderous term towards Dutch people. The use started as early as World War II, when German soldiers were known to call the Dutch "cheeseheads".
The term "cheesehead" was used in a derogatory manner in the 1969 novel Papillon to describe the French jury that sentenced Papillon to life in prison.

References

1987 neologisms
American regional nicknames
Pejorative demonyms
History of the Green Bay Packers
Spectators of American football
Symbols of Wisconsin
Wisconsin culture
Novelty items